John Francis Ryan (May 5, 1905 – September 2, 1967) was a reserve outfielder in Major League Baseball who played briefly for the Boston Red Sox during the  season. He was born in West Mineral, Kansas.

Little is known about this LF/RF who played on a Red Sox uniform with few stars. The team finished last with a 58–96 record and only 394,620 fans came to see them play at Fenway Park that season. Ryan appeared in two games and went hitless in three at-bats, as he did not commit error in his only fielding chance.

Ryan died at the age of 62 in Rochester, Minnesota.

External links
Baseball Reference
Retrosheet

Boston Red Sox players
Major League Baseball outfielders
Baseball players from Kansas
1905 births
1967 deaths
People from Cherokee County, Kansas